Nahún Alberto Espinoza Zerón (born 14 August 1964) is a retired Honduran football player and football manager, who currently is in charge of Club Deportivo Olimpia.

Club career
He started his career at Real España and also had a lengthy spell with Olimpia, winning 5 league titles. He played with Alex Pineda Chacón, Belarmino Rivera, Eugenio Dolmo Flores, Danilo Galindo and his brother Juan Carlos Espinoza in the Olimpia and they won the CONCACAF Champions League in 1988

International career
Espinoza made his debut for Honduras in a December 1994 friendly match against the United States, coming on as a late substitute for Mario Peri. It proved to be his sole international game.

Managerial career
He has coached Platense and Olimpia, with whom he won three consecutive titles. He also was technical advisor at Vida and shortly manager of Victoria and Second Division side UPNFM.

In September 2012, Espinoza succeeded Chelato Uclés as manager of Real España, with his brother Juan Carlos named as his assistant. He however announced in November 2012 to leave the club after the season.

Personal life
Nahún is the younger brother of former international midfielder Juan Carlos Espinoza. Their brother Enrique, who died in April 2012, was also a former player of Olimpia.

Honours and awards

Club
C.D. Olimpia
Liga Profesional de Honduras (5): 1989–90, 1992–93, 1995–96, 1996–97, 1998–99
Honduran Cup: (2): 1995, 1998
Honduran Supercup: (1): 1997
Copa Interclubes UNCAF (1): 1999, 2000
CONCACAF Champions League (1): 1988

C.D. Real Espana
Copa Interclubes UNCAF (1): 1982

References

External links

 “Soy muy sentimental”: Nahún Espinoza - Diez 
 Nahún Espinoza: “Este equipo de Tosello puede alcanzar y superar mi récord (Partial biography - La Prensa 

1964 births
Living people
People from Tela
Association football defenders
Honduran footballers
Honduras international footballers
Real C.D. España players
C.D. Olimpia players
Liga Nacional de Fútbol Profesional de Honduras players
Honduran football managers
C.D. Olimpia managers
Platense F.C. managers
Real C.D. España managers
Club Xelajú MC managers